Olaf Marschall (born 19 March 1966) is a German former professional footballer who played as a forward.

Club career
Marschall's career started in the GDR at BSG Chemie Torgau and was soon transferred to 1. FC Lok Leipzig. There, he rose to stardom, becoming one of the most prolific scorers in the East German top-flight in the turbulent late 1980s and collecting caps for the East German football squad. Marschall was regarded as a strong header which deft ballhandling skills, allowing him to play center-striker, hole and offensive midfield with equal effectiveness. He scored 43 goals in 135 Oberliga matches.

In the wake of the German reunification he joined Austrian outfit SCN Admira/Wacker in 1990 to stay on in Austria's Bundesliga, until he joined Dynamo Dresden to help the East German outfit escape relegation from the German Bundesliga in 1993–94. In 1994, he joined 1. FC Kaiserslautern and established himself as one of the elite scorers in the Bundesliga. He won the DFB-Pokal in 1996 and in 1998 the Bundesliga title. Marschall was the Bundesliga second-leading goal-scorer in the 1997–98 season, as he led Kaiserslautern to the title.

International career
Looking back on a remarkable scoring record in 1997–98, Marschall was nominated for the German squad and took part in the 1998 FIFA World Cup.

In the latter stages of his career, the slower-footed, but still header-strong Marschall was occasionally used as a defender. He played with 1. FC Kaiserslautern until 2002, scoring 60 goals in 176 Bundesliga games.

Post-retirement 
Having retired as a player in 2002, he was part of the management of the then Bundesliga side 1. FC Kaiserslautern. Ahead of 2006–07 he joined Al-Nasr Sports Club Dubai to work as assistant-manager under manager Reiner Hollmann.

Marschall is now the first scout with the German club FSV Frankfurt.

Career statistics
Scores and results list Germany's goal tally first, score column indicates score after each Marschall goal.

External links

References

1966 births
Living people
People from Torgau
People from Bezirk Leipzig
German footballers
East German footballers
Footballers from Saxony
East Germany international footballers
Germany international footballers
Association football forwards
Dual internationalists (football)
DDR-Oberliga players
1999 FIFA Confederations Cup players
Bundesliga players
2. Bundesliga players
FC Admira Wacker Mödling players
1. FC Lokomotive Leipzig players
1. FC Kaiserslautern players
Dynamo Dresden players
Al-Gharafa SC players
1998 FIFA World Cup players
German expatriate sportspeople in Austria
Expatriate footballers in Austria
German expatriate footballers
German expatriate sportspeople in Qatar
Expatriate footballers in Qatar